Richbourg Motors Building was a historic auto showroom located at Asheville, Buncombe County, North Carolina. It was built in 1926, and is a three-story slightly curved building faced in brick.  It featured a parapet with brick panels and limestone coping.  The building was built for Tench C. Coxe and leased to the Richbourg Motor Company, Asheville's Ford and Lincoln dealer. The building has since been demolished.

It was listed on the National Register of Historic Places in 1979.

References

Commercial buildings on the National Register of Historic Places in North Carolina
Commercial buildings completed in 1926
Buildings and structures in Asheville, North Carolina
National Register of Historic Places in Buncombe County, North Carolina